Nymphicula blandialis is a moth in the family Crambidae. It was described by Francis Walker in 1859. It is found in southern China, India, Malaysia, Sri Lanka, Taiwan, Japan, the Democratic Republic of the Congo, Ghana, Guinea, Mozambique, Nigeria, South Africa and Uganda.

References

Nymphicula
Moths described in 1859